KWWL (channel 7) is a television station licensed to Waterloo, Iowa, United States, serving as the NBC affiliate for Eastern Iowa. Owned by Allen Media Broadcasting, KWWL maintains studios on East 5th Street in Waterloo, with news bureaus and advertising sales offices in Cedar Rapids, Dubuque and Iowa City. The station's transmitter is located north of Rowley, Iowa, a city in Buchanan County.

History

When the Federal Communications Commission (FCC) opened up bids for channel 7 in Waterloo, it was obvious that the license would either go to Sonderling Broadcasting, owner of KXEL (1540 AM), or R.J. McElroy and his Black Hawk Broadcasting Company, owner of KWWL (1330 AM, now KPTY). After a long legal battle, Black Hawk won the license, and KWWL-TV signed on for the first time on November 29, 1953.

The station was originally affiliated with NBC and the DuMont network. During the late 1950s, the station was also briefly affiliated with the NTA Film Network.

In 1980, Black Hawk agreed in principle to merge with Forward Communications. However, the FCC told Black Hawk and Forward that the combined company would have to sell either KWWL-AM-FM or channel 7. The KWWL stations had been grandfathered under a 1970s FCC rule banning common ownership of radio and television stations. When Forward decided to keep the radio stations, Black Hawk sold channel 7, along with then-sister station KTIV in Sioux City, to AFLAC just before the merger closed. In 1997, AFLAC sold its entire broadcasting division, including KWWL, to Raycom Media.

In 2006, Raycom sold KWWL and a handful of other stations following its purchase of the Liberty Corporation in late 2005. Quincy Newspapers became owner of KWWL on July 1, 2006. The merger made QNI the owner of four of the NBC affiliates serving Iowa, along with flagship station WGEM-TV in Quincy, Illinois, KTTC in Rochester, Minnesota, and Black Hawk/AFLAC sibling KTIV, which had been sold to QNI in 1989.

KWWL has been digital-only since February 17, 2009. The "KWWL" callsign was legally transferred from the now-defunct analog channel 7 to the new digital channel 7, with the "KWWL-DT" callsign being permanently discontinued.

On November 1, 2010, the FCC granted KWWL a construction permit for a 300-watt digital fill-in translator on channel 7 (the same frequency as their main channel). The translator would serve the immediate part and areas northwest of Dubuque. The permit was later canceled on June 6, 2013.

On January 7, 2021, Quincy Media announced that it had put itself up for sale. A few weeks later, Gray Television announced its intent to purchase Quincy for $925 million. As Gray already owns the market's KCRG-TV and both stations rank among the top four in ratings in the Cedar Rapids–Waterloo market, it intended to keep KCRG-TV and divest KWWL in order to satisfy FCC requirements. On April 29, 2021, it was announced that Allen Media Group would acquire KWWL and the remaining Quincy stations not being acquired by Gray Television for $380 million. The sale was completed on August 2 the same year, making KWWL a sister station to CBS affiliate KIMT in nearby Mason City. Gray's decision to sell KWWL came as an ironic twist, given that they had acquired the station's previous owner Raycom in 2019.

Studio renovation
In late 2014, the KWWL building underwent a major renovation project, which involved extensive interior and exterior work. The neighboring American Legion building was demolished to make way for a new parking lot. This also led to the building's "front" changing from the 4th Street side to the 5th Street side. Further exterior work restored the 4th Street side to how it appeared when the building was first constructed in the early 1900s. This included restoring original trim and detail work, as well as the large windows which surrounded half the building. On the interior, the newsroom and studio were relocated to the newly renovated and updated second floor. The new KWWL set debuted on October 26, 2016. A week later, demolition and remodeling of the first floor began. In July 2017, the remainder of KWWL's departments (Marketing, Sales and Administration) moved to their new location on the first floor. The full renovation of the studio building was completed on September 20, 2017.

KWWL-DT2
KWWL-DT2 is the Heroes & Icons-affiliated second digital subchannel of KWWL, broadcasting in 720p high definition on channel 7.2.

History

KWWL-DT2 began operations in November 2004 as an affiliate of NBC Weather Plus, airing national weather forecasts from the service as well as inserts of local weather forecasts from the KWWL weather center. However, on October 7, 2008, NBC Universal announced that they would shut down the NBC Weather Plus service by December 31, 2008, concurrently, in January 2009, that subchannel began airing This TV programming.

In April 2016, KWWL announced that they would add programming from The CW on KWWL-DT2 beginning on September 12, 2016. At the same time, KWWL-DT2 ended its seven-year affiliation with This TV. This resulted in an affiliation swap between KWWL-DT2 and Iowa City-based KWKB (channel 20), the Cedar Rapids market's former CW affiliate, which then became the This TV affiliate for the Cedar Rapids market.

On August 2, 2021, The CW moved to KCRG-DT3, replacing Antenna TV, and KWWL ended up replacing The CW with Heroes & Icons, which moved from KCRG-DT4.

Programming

Syndicated programming
Syndicated programs aired by KWWL include Wheel of Fortune, Jeopardy!, Inside Edition, and Live with Kelly and Ryan.

News operation

On April 11, 2010, KWWL became the first station in eastern Iowa and the first QNI station to broadcast its newscasts in high definition. At this time, its updated its logo, removing the large blue circle that surrounded the 7.

Notable current on-air staff
 Ron Steele – 1974–present, anchor

Notable former on-air staff
 Paul Burmeister – sports anchor/reporter (now at NFL Network)
 Bob Hogue – 1979–1984, sports director, play-by-play announcer for Iowa Television Network. Now Commissioner of Pacific West Conference
 Liz Mathis – 1980–1996, anchor (later at KCRG, currently employed by Four Oaks in Cedar Rapids)
 Mark Steines – former host of The Home and Family Show on Hallmark Channel
 Irv Weinstein – 90 days in the early 1950s as a director; he was fired and eventually returned to his native Western New York as an anchor for WKBW; now deceased

Subchannels
The station's digital signal is multiplexed:

References

1.  Lipps, Rick and Weaver, Tim. KWWL Station History (https://web.archive.org/web/20050310021154/http://www.kwwl.com/Global/story.asp?S=277765) Date Accessed: July 30, 2005. Waterloo, Iowa: KWWL.

External links
 
 KWWL About Us Page

NBC network affiliates
Entertainment Studios
Waterloo, Iowa
Television channels and stations established in 1953
Heroes & Icons affiliates
MeTV affiliates
Court TV affiliates
True Crime Network affiliates
WWL (TV)
1953 establishments in Iowa
Missouri Valley Conference broadcasters